Aernout Mik (born 3 July 1962) is a Dutch artist, internationally known for his installations and films.

Biografie 

Mik spent his childhood in Groningen and studied there from 1983 to 1988 at the Academie Minerva. He had his first solo exhibition in 2000 at the Van Abbemuseum in Eindhoven under the title "Primal gestures, minor roles".

In 1997 Mik received the Sandberg Prize for his videos Lick (1996) and Fluff (1996). In 2002 received the Dr. Mik. A.H. Heineken Prize for Art.

Aernout Mik by Maria Hlavajova, curator of the Dutch  in Venice, selected in 2007 for the Netherlands to take part in the Venice Biennale. In 1997, Mik, along with designer William Oorebeek this same thing to see. In 2001 he took part in "Post-Nature ', an exhibition of Dutch art which took place in Venice.

The work called Organic Escalator (2000) is housed in the Art Collection Fondation Pinault and was end-2007 in Lille on the exhibition "Passage du temps".

References

External links 
 Aernout Mik's profile at carlier | gebauer gallery
 Aernout Mik Biennale site Citizens and Subjects
 Videostills uit het werk van Aernout Mik
 Recensie van een overzichtstentoonstelling in NRC Handelsblad
 Biography op VPRO website
 Heineken lecture Echt/Onecht door Aernhout Mik
 Overzicht van tentoonstellingen

1962 births
Living people
Winners of the Heineken Prize
People from Groningen (city)
Dutch contemporary artists